This is a list of notable alumni and faculty of Patna University.

Notable faculty

Kapil Muni Tiwary, linguist
Hetukar Jha, sociologist, also alumnus
Papiya Ghosh, historian, also alumnus
R. K. Sinha, scholar of English
Ravindra Kumar Sinha, environmentalist and Padma Shri recipient

Notable alumni

Politics and Law 

Anugrah Narayan Sinha, nationalist and first Deputy Chief Minister of Bihar
Baccha Prasad Singh, Indian Maoist politician
Bali Ram Bhagat, former speaker of Lok Sabha
Balmiki Prasad Singh, scholar, Governor of Sikkim (2008–2013)
Bhuvaneshwar Prasad Sinha, 6th Chief Justice of India
Chhedi Paswan, Member Of Parliament
Dilip Sinha, Indian diplomat and ambassador
Digvijay Singh, former Union Minister of India
Krishna Sahi, former Union Minister
Shri Krishna Singh, first Chief Minister of Bihar
Lalit Mohan Sharma, former Chief Justice of India
Lalu Prasad Yadav, former Chief Minister of Bihar
Ravi Shankar Prasad, senior advocate, Supreme Court of India, Union Minister of IT and Law and Justice
Nitish Kumar, socialist, National President, Janta Dal (U), current Chief Minister of Bihar
Ram Dulari Sinha, former Union Minister of state, former Kerala Governor, freedom fighter
Abhayanand, educationalist, IPS officer
Ram Vilas Paswan, ( Founder Of LJP ), Former Railway Minister Of India, Member Of Indian Parliament, Union Minister Of India
Vijay Kumar Chaudhary, WRD minister of Bihar
Sanjay Paswan, Professor, Former Minister of state in Govt Of India, Member Of Bihar Legislative Council
Satyendra Narayan Sinha, member of Provisional Parliament, former Chief Minister of Bihar
Surur Hoda, Socialist Leader
Yashwant Sinha, former Minister of Finance
Ram deo Bhandary, former member of parliament and former general secretary of RJD

 Jagdeo Prasad, former deputy chief minister of Bihar

Science and Technology 
Samprada Singh founder of Alkem Laboratories 
Anand Kumar, Indian mathematician and educationalist
Ravindra Kumar Sinha, environmentalist
Tathagat Avatar Tulsi, physicist
Devendra Prasad Gupta, Indian botanist and academician
Sudhanshu Shekhar Jha, condensed matter physicist
H. C. Verma, Indian experimental physicist
Tathagat Avatar Tulsi, scientist and child prodigy.

Arts

Literature 

Kalim Ajiz, Urdu poet
Satinath Bhaduri, novelist
Ramdhari Singh Dinkar, Hindi poet

Others 
Shaibal Gupta, economist and social scientist
Bindeshwar Pathak, founder of Sulabh International
Gopal Prasad Sinha, neurologist, politician
Indradeep Sinha, economist, writer and veteran communist leader
Jayaprakash Narayan, freedom fighter
Ram Karan Sharma, scholar of Sanskrit
Ram Raj Pant, founder of Nepal Law College and pioneering linguist of Nepali language
Rustum Roy, influential material scientist, professor and author
Ravish Kumar, news anchor, editor at NDTV
Sweta Singh, news anchor and Deputy Editor of Aaj Tak
Ranjit Sinha, Director of the Central Bureau of Investigation
Vashishtha Narayan Singh, mathematician
Vikas Jha, author and journalist
 Abdul Bari

References

Patna University
Patna_University_people